Mohammad Ghanbari (born 2 January 1995)is an Iranian football player. He currently plays for Fajr sepasi in the Persian Gulf Pro League.

References

People from Tabriz
Iranian footballers
1995 births
Fajr Sepasi players
Living people
Association football central defenders